The  is a subway line owned and operated by Tokyo Metro in Tokyo, Japan. The line runs between Meguro in Shinagawa and Akabane-Iwabuchi in Kita.

On maps, diagrams and signboards, the line is shown using the color emerald (previously coded "teal"), and its stations are given numbers using the letter "N".

Overview

Under an agreement between Tokyo Metro and the Tokyo Metropolitan Government, the fare for this section is calculated on the Toei fare system for passengers traveling to stations on the Mita Line past Shirokane-Takanawa, on the Metro fare system for passengers traveling to stations on the Namboku Line past Shirokane-Takanawa, and on the system "most beneficial to the passenger" (presently the Metro schedule) for travel solely on the shared sector.

On maps, diagrams and signboards, the Namboku Line is shown using the color emerald (▉), and its stations are given numbers using the letter "N".

Station list 
 All stations are located in Tokyo.
 All services stop at all stations.

Rolling stock
 Tokyo Metro 9000 series 6-car EMUs
 Saitama Rapid Railway 2000 series 6-car EMUs
 Tokyu 3000 series 6/8-car EMUs
 Tokyu 5080 series 8-car EMUs
 Tokyu 3020 series 8-car EMUs
 Sotetsu 21000 series 8-car EMUs

History
The  Namboku Line is one of Tokyo Metro's newer lines, featuring advanced technology including full automatic train operation and platform screen doors. Although the line was originally proposed in 1968, construction did not begin until the 1980s, partly due to the right-of-way to Meguro with the Toei Mita Line.

The line initially operated with four-car EMUs. Upon its extension to Yotsuya in March 1996, the formations were extended to six cars. On 1 April 2022, eight-car trains began operating on the line.

Through service with the Saitama Rapid Railway Line commenced when it opened in March 2001 and accommodated traffic to and from Saitama Stadium during the 2002 World Cup. Although the Saitama Line is more or less a northern extension of the Namboku Line, it nevertheless remains a private entity to which the Namboku Line offers through services with.

The Namboku Line was inherited by Tokyo Metro after the privatization of the Teito Rapid Transit Authority (TRTA) in 2004.

Future plans 
On 28 January 2022, Tokyo Metro announced that a  spur line from Shirokane-takanawa to Shinagawa would be built. The extension is expected to cost  and scheduled to begin revenue service in the mid-2030s. It is intended to increase connections to and from the Chūō Shinkansen, which is scheduled to open for service in 2027.

References

 Shaw, Dennis and Morioka, Hisashi, "Tokyo Subways", published 1992 by Hoikusha Publishing

External links

 Tokyo Metro website 

 
Namboku Line
Railway lines in Tokyo
Railway lines opened in 1991
1067 mm gauge railways in Japan
1991 establishments in Japan